Deshin Shekpa (1384–1415), also Deshin Shegpa, Dezhin Shekpa and Dezhin Shegpa, was the fifth Gyalwa Karmapa, head of the Karma Kagyu, a subschool of the Kagyu School of Tibetan Buddhism.

Deshin Shekpa was born in Nyang Dam in the south of Tibet. According to the legend he said after being born: "I am the Karmapa. Om mani padme hum shri." Deshin Shekpa was taken to Tsawa Phu who recognized him as the reincarnation of the Karmapa. Deshin traveled extensively through Tibet and Mongolia and taught people about non-violence.

After having finished his education, he was invited in 1403 by the emperor, because Emperor Zhu Di, the Yongle Emperor, (1402–1424) had a vision of Avalokitesvara. He also required religious ceremonies to be held for his deceased parents.

After a long journey beginning in 1403, he arrived in Nanjing, the then capital on April 10, 1407 on an elephant, at the imperial palace, where tens of thousands of monks greeted him. He convinced the emperor that there were different Buddhist branches for different people and that does not mean that one branch is better than the other.

The Karmapa was very well received during his visit to the capital and a number of miraculous occurrences are reported. He also performed ceremonies for the emperor's family. The emperor presented him with 700 measures of silver objects and bestowed the title of 'Precious Religious King, Great Loving One of the West, Mighty Buddha of Peace'. He also gave him a material representation of the famous and ethereal  'Vajra Crown' which was said to be invisible to all except those of most pure spirit. It was woven in black brocade and studded with jewels.

Aside from religious matters, Emperor Cheng Zu wished to establish an alliance with the Karmapa similar to the one the Yuan (1277-1367 CE) emperors had established with the Sakyapa. The Ming emperor apparently offered to send regular armies to unify Tibet under the Karmapa but Deshin Shekpa declined this rather un-Buddhist offer.

Deshin left Nanjing on 17 May 1408 CE. In 1410 he returned to Tsurphu where he had his monastery rebuilt which had been severely damaged by an earthquake.

References
 Lama Kunsang, Lama Pemo, Marie Aubèle (2012). History of the Karmapas: The Odyssey of the Tibetan Masters with the Black Crown. Snow Lion Publications, Ithaca, New York. .

Footnotes

1384 births
1415 deaths
5
14th-century Tibetan people
15th-century Tibetan people